Eupithecia soricella is a moth in the family Geometridae first described by Daniel Lucas in 1938. It is found in Algeria.

References

Moths described in 1938
soricella
Moths of Africa